Pantomime is a type of musical comedy stage production, developed in England and designed for family entertainment, mostly performed during Christmas and New Year season.

Pantomime may also refer to:
 Acting or performance such as that performed by a mime artist, using silent gestures
 American pantomime, a North American variant of the English theatrical genre
 Charades, a party game sometimes called "pantomime"
 Pantomime (The Pillows EP), by The Pillows (also the title of its first track)
 Pantomime (Polara EP), by Polara (also the title of its first track)
 "Pantomime", a song by Incubus from the album Alive at Red Rocks
 "Pantomime", a song by Orgy from the album Candyass
 Pantomime (novel), a 2013 novel by Laura Lam

See also
 
 
 Panto (disambiguation)
 Mime (disambiguation)
 Dumbshow